Nelson David Becerra (born July 20, 1987) is a Peruvian footballer currently playing for FC Motown in the National Premier Soccer League.

Career

College and Amateur
Becerra grew up in Paterson, New Jersey, and attended Saint Benedict's Preparatory School, where he was a teammate of fellow professional José Angulo. He began his college soccer at Centenary College of New Jersey, where he earned NSCAA second team Metro Region accolades, Skyline Conference first team honors, and was named Skyline Conference Rookie of the Year. He transferred to St. John's University prior to his sophomore season. In 2008, Becerra earned NSCAA All-Northeast Region third team honors; he was also named the Midfielder of the Year for the Big East conference and was part of the All-BIG EAST first team as a junior. He helped lead the Red Storm to their first College Cup appearance since 2003, earning himself an invitation to the 2010 MLS Combine.

During his college years, Becerra also played in the USL Premier Development League for the Long Island Rough Riders and the Central Jersey Spartans. He scored three goals in 10 games with the Long Island Rough Riders in 2008. With the Spartans in 2010, he bagged eight assists in only nine games.

Professional
Having attended the MLS combine in 2010, Becerra signed his first professional contract in 2011 when he signed with the Harrisburg City Islanders of the USL Professional Division. He made his professional debut on April 23 in a 1–0 loss to the Pittsburgh Riverhounds, and scored his first professional goal on May 14 in a 1–1 tie with the Richmond Kickers.

References

External links
 Harrisburg City Islanders bio
 St. Johns profile

1987 births
Living people
Footballers from Lima
Association football midfielders
Peruvian footballers
St. John's Red Storm men's soccer players
Wigry Suwałki players
Long Island Rough Riders players
Central Jersey Spartans players
Penn FC players
Jersey Express S.C. players
USL League Two players
USL Championship players
Peruvian expatriate footballers
Expatriate footballers in Poland
FC Motown players